Grafenwoehr Training Area (GTA), also known as the U.S. Army Garrison Grafenwoehr (abbreviated USAG Grafenwoehr), is a United States Army military training base located near Grafenwöhr, eastern Bavaria, Germany.  At , it is the largest training facility of the United States of America in Europe.  The base is operated by 7th Army Joint Multinational Training Command, and includes live firing training areas.  Grafenwoehr facilities include the Tower Barracks.  Grafenwoehr Training Area now comes under the command of the U.S. Army Garrison Bavaria.

History
The military training area was established in 1907 by clearing  at least 58 smaller villages, and used to train troops for the III Royal Bavarian Corps. During the course of the war, a myriad of different units were trained in the area, including foreign volunteers of the Wehrmacht and Waffen-SS, as well as four divisions of the Italian Social Republic's National Republican Army.

Following World War II, the base was occupied by the United States Army.  On 2 September 1960, 16 American soldiers were killed and 26 injured when an 8-inch howitzer shell crashed into them during a morning roll call.  The shell had been overloaded with charge, and when fired, went  beyond its target.

Assigned units
From December 2018 to February 2019, Grafenwoehr Training Area housed more than 5,000 soldiers of the 1st Armored Brigade Combat Team, 1st Cavalry Division - Ironhorse brigade, which is the current Regionally Aligned Force in eastern Europe.  As the current Regionally Aligned Force in Europe, one of the brigade's main mission is increasing interoperability with other NATO nations.  Grafenwoehr Training Area allowed the entire brigade to re-consolidate all forces in preparation for redeployment back to Fort Hood, Texas.  Within the training area, Camp Aachen and Camp Algiers are located on the Grafenwoehr Training Area, and provide housing support, as well as an Morale, Welfare and Recreation (MWR), United Service Organizations (USO), and Army and Air Force Exchange Service (AAFES) shoppette facility.  In addition, Grafenwoehr Training Area is home to the Joint Multinational Simulation Centre specifically located on the Camp Aachen portion of the training area.

References

External links

Grafenwoehr Training Area — official website, at Eur.Army.mil
Grafenwoehr Training Area official Facebook page
U.S. Army Garrison Bavaria — official website, at Bavaria.Army.mil

1907 establishments in Germany
Installations of the United States Army in Germany
Military installations established in 1907
Military training areas in Germany